Christopher Dobson may refer to:

 Chris Dobson (1949–2019), British chemist
 Christopher Dobson (librarian) (1916–2005), English librarian